The USA Basketball Female Athlete of the Year is an annual award issued by USA Basketball that honors the top American female basketball performer during the year's international competition.

See also
 USA Basketball Male Athlete of the Year

References

American basketball trophies and awards
Most valuable player awards
Lists of women's basketball players in the United States